The Central Narcotics Bureau (CNB) is a department under the Ministry of Home Affairs and the primary drug enforcement agency in Singapore. CNB is responsible for coordinating all matters pertaining to drug eradication. Its current director is Ng Ser Song.

History
On 19 October 1971, the Government of Singapore announced that a new and dedicated Central Narcotics Bureau (CNB), would be set up within the Ministry of Home Affairs.  Then-Minister for Home Affairs Wong Lin Ken said, "Such activities will be coordinated in the Central Narcotics Bureau. CNB also plans to build a capacity to educate the public in the dangers of drug abuse".

In 1973, Singapore's government introduced the Misuse of Drugs Act (MDA) 15 to deal with drug traffickers, pushers and addicts. The enactment of the MDA was intended to consolidate the provisions of the Dangerous Drugs Ordinance 1951 (DDO) and Drugs (Prevention of Misuse) Act 1969 (DPMA), and secondly to more effectively deal with the worsening drug situation. New legislation was deemed to be necessary by then-Minister for Health and Home Affairs Chua Sian Chin in Parliament in 1973. "The Dangerous Drugs Act (i.e DDO) was enacted about 21 years ago and the controls provided therein are grossly inadequate for the 70's, with the introduction of a host of new drugs of medical value if properly used." The need was exacerbated by Singapore's geographical location and development into a trading hub. The proximity to the Golden Triangle is another oft-cited justification for tough anti-drug laws.

In November 1993, the "Committee to Improve the Drug Situation in Singapore" was set up to look into the drug situation and it recommended a total and integrated approach to deal with the drug problem. The four main anti-drug strategies are Preventive Drug Education, Rigorous Enforcement, Treatment and Rehabilitation for addicts, and Aftercare and Continued Rehabilitation for ex-addicts to reintegrate them into society. CNB was to be in charge of Rigorous Enforcement and Preventive Drug Education.

Functions

Drug enforcement

Legal Powers 
All Narcotics Officers are defined as an "officer of the Bureau" under the Misuse of Drugs Act. This empowers them to enter and search any place reasonably believed to contain controlled drugs without a warrant. They may also search a person or subject persons to urine or hair tests.

Raids 
CNB conducts regular nationwide operations to conduct checks against drug abusers and ex-drug abusers who may have relapsed. Other than island-wide operations, CNB conducts operations targeted at specific areas where intelligence sources indicate that drug activity is taking place. CNB officers also work in closely with officers from other Home Team agencies such as the Singapore Police Force and Immigration and Checkpoints Authority.

Preventive drug education
Drug trafficking is commonly known in the republic as a criminal offence punishable by hanging, which is enforced under Schedule 2 of the Misuse of Drugs Act, any person importing, exporting, or found in possession of more than the threshold quantities of illegal drugs can a mandatory death sentence. Examples of high-profile cases such as the capital punishment of drug traffickers Van Tuong Nguyen, Shanmugam Murugesu, and Nagaenthran K. Dharmalingam.

CNB's Preventive Education Unit (PEU) was formed in 1992 to focus solely on the formation and implementation of preventive drug education (PDE) programmes in Singapore. Such PDE programmes include the Anti-Drug Abuse Carnival 2015. Movie star Jackie Chan was named in May 2015 as the first celebrity anti-drug ambassador of the country.

In 2021, a short film titled Down The Rabbit Hole was created by the Central Narcotics Bureau to remind young people of the hazards of drug abuse. Actress Jasmine Sim starred as the main character and antagonist (she portrayed a drug trafficker) of the film.

Personnel
CNB officers are public servants by law and are part of the Singapore Civil Service. The Director of CNB reports to the Permanent Secretary and to the Minister of Home Affairs.

Recruitment 
All new Narcotics Officers must under go a period of residential training in the Home Team Academy (HTA) and pass all required tests.  Potential recruits can enter either as a Direct-Entry Inspector or a Direct-Entry Sergeant. Male recruits must be physically fit (i.e. pass the IPPT). They must also have completed National Service with a Physical Employment Status of A or B1, which implies that they are the most medically fit within the male population. For male CNB officers, their National Service liabilities will be paused as long as they are in the Bureau, making them the equivalent of Regular officers in the Armed, Civil Defence or Police forces.

Direct-Entry Inspector 
Potential Inspectors undergo nine months of basic training to learn various skills such as applying knowledge of criminal laws, investigation techniques, self-defence tactics and weapons handling. The nine-month training phase also includes an overseas component. There is a two-year bond which must be fulfilled lest a financial penalty be imposed.

After graduation, Direct-Entry Inspectors enter a foundation 1.5-year posting at the Enforcement Division or Investigation Division.

Direct-Entry Sergeant 
Direct-Entry Sergeants must minimally be a Higher NITEC, GCE "A" level or Polytechnic Diploma holder. They undergo six months of basic training before being posted out to various work units for on-the-job training.

Equipment 
CNB officers are issued and trained in the use of Glock 19 pistols as a standard issue sidearm. Officers are also trained and issued with expandable batons for less than lethal self-defense options, bulletproof vests and handcuffs for restrains.

Special Task Force 
CNB maintains a small, specialized and covert unit called the Special Task Force (STF) which carry out high risk operations (such as vehicle pursuits and conducting house raids), forced entry and performing round-the-clock surveillance of syndicate activities since 1997. Officers must have at least two years of experience in CNB to join the STF. Members have access to battering rams and electric cutters for forced entry with Heckler & Koch USP Compact pistols issued as their primary firearm.

Organisation structure 
The bureau is commanded by the director, who is assisted by the deputy director.

Supporting the director and deputy director are the operational line and staff divisions, namely Intelligence Division, Enforcement Division, Investigation Division, Operations Division, Policy, Planning and Research Division, Corporate Services Division, Communications Division and Staff Development Division.

There is also an Internal Investigations Office and Psychology Unit that provide additional staff support.

Enforcement Sector 1 covers the geographical boundaries served by the Singapore Police Force's 'A' (Central), 'E' (Tanglin), and 'G' (Bedok) divisions, as well as Marine and Airport. Enforcement Sector 2 covers the geographical boundaries served by SPF's 'F' (Ang Mo Kio), 'J' (Jurong) and 'L' (Woodlands) divisions, as well as Tuas and Woodlands Checkpoints.

References

External links
Central Narcotics Bureau
Misuse of Drugs Act

1971 establishments in Singapore
Law enforcement agencies of Singapore
Drug control law enforcement agencies
Organisations of the Singapore Government
Drug policy of Singapore